Dean Hawkshaw (born 24 April 1997) is a Scottish footballer who plays for Stranraer as a midfielder. Hawkshaw has previously played for Kilmarnock, Glenafton Athletic and Airdrieonians.

Career
Hawkshaw made his league debut for Kilmarnock in August 2016 against Motherwell, being taken off after a clash of heads with Carl McHugh. McHugh was out of play for several months with a head injury, while Hawkshaw had a concussion. Hawkshaw was out for months with a later knee injury. He remained in and around the first-team under the management of both Lee Clark and Lee McCulloch, but dropped out of the squad under Steve Clarke. Hawkshaw was loaned to Stranraer in January 2018, and released by Kilmarnock at the end of the 2017–18 season.

Hawkshaw made a trial appearance for Greenock Morton in a friendly against Forfar Athletic in July 2018. He signed for Junior side Glenafton Athletic in September 2018.

Hawkshaw then moved to Scottish League One club Airdrieonians, and made his first league appearance for the club in a 1–0 win against Forfar on 23 March 2019. In May 2019, he signed a new contract with the club. Hawkshaw returned to Stranraer in July 2021.

Career statistics

References

External links

Living people
1997 births
Scottish footballers
Kilmarnock F.C. players
Scottish Professional Football League players
Association football midfielders
Stranraer F.C. players
Glenafton Athletic F.C. players
Scottish Junior Football Association players
Airdrieonians F.C. players